Rajaiah may refer to 

 Sunnam Rajaiah - Indian politician
 T. Rajaiah - MLA 
 Siricilla Rajaiah - Member of Parliament